Bowling is a target sport and recreational activity in which a player rolls a ball toward pins (in pin bowling) or another target (in target bowling). The term bowling usually refers to pin bowling (most commonly ten-pin bowling), though in the United Kingdom and Commonwealth countries, bowling could also refer to target bowling, such as lawn bowls.

In pin bowling, the goal is to knock over pins on a long playing surface known as a lane. Lanes have a wood or synthetic surface onto which protective lubricating oil is applied in different specified oil patterns that affect ball motion. A strike is achieved when all the pins are knocked down on the first roll, and a spare is achieved if all the pins are knocked over on a second roll. Common types of pin bowling include ten-pin, candlepin, duckpin, nine-pin, and five-pin. The historical game skittles is the forerunner of modern pin bowling.

In target bowling, the aim is usually to get the ball as close to a mark as possible.  The surface in target bowling may be grass, gravel, or synthetic.  Lawn bowls, bocce, carpet bowls, pétanque, and boules may have both indoor and outdoor varieties. Curling is also related to bowls. 

Bowling is played by 120 million people in more than 90 countries (including 70 million in the United States alone).

Variations
Bowling games can be distinguished into two general classes, pin bowling and target bowling.

Pin bowling

Five main variations are found in North America, with ten-pin being the most common but others being practiced in the eastern U.S. and in parts of Canada:
 Ten-pin bowling: largest and heaviest pins, and bowled with a large ball with two or three finger holes.
 Nine-pin bowling: uses a small ball without finger holes.
 Candlepin bowling: tallest pins (at ), thin with matching ends, bowled with the smallest and lightest (at ) handheld ball of any bowling sport, and the only form with no fallen pins removed during a frame.
 Duckpin bowling: short, squat, and bowled with a handheld ball.
 Five-pin bowling: tall, between duckpins and candlepins in diameter with a rubber girdle, bowled with a handheld ball, mostly found in Canada.

Target bowling

Another form of bowling is usually played outdoors on a lawn. At outdoor bowling, the players throw a ball, which is sometimes eccentrically weighted, in an attempt to put it closest to a designated point or slot in the bowling arena. (Ex: Bocce Ball, an Italian lawn game)

History

Ancient history

The earliest known forms of bowling date back to ancient Egypt, with wall drawings depicting bowling being found in a royal Egyptian tomb dated to 5200 BC and miniature pins and balls in an Egyptian child's grave about 5200 BC. Remnants of bowling balls were found among artifacts in ancient Egypt going back to the Egyptian protodynastic period in 3200 BC.  What is thought to be a child's game involving porphyry (stone) balls, a miniature trilithon, and nine breccia-veined alabaster vase-shaped figures—thought to resemble the more modern game of skittles—was found in Naqada, Egypt in 1895.

Balls were made using the husks of grains, covered in a material such as leather, and bound with string.  Other balls made of porcelain have also been found, indicating that these were rolled along the ground rather than thrown due to their size and weight. Some of these resemble the modern-day jack used in target bowl games. Bowling games of different forms are also noted by Herodotus as an invention of the Lydians in Asia Minor.

About 2,000 years ago, in the Roman Empire, a similar game evolved between Roman legionaries entailing the tossing of stone objects as close as possible to other stone objects, which eventually evolved into Italian Bocce, or outdoor bowling.

Around 400 AD, bowling began in Germany as a religious ritual to cleanse oneself from sin by rolling a rock into a club (kegel) representing the heathen, resulting in bowlers being called keglers.

Post-classical history
In 1299, the oldest-surviving known bowling green for target style bowling was built: Master's Close (now the Old Bowling Green of the Southampton Bowling Club) in Southampton, England, which is still in use.

In 1325, laws were passed in Berlin and Cologne that limited bets on lawn bowling to five shillings.

In 1366, the first official mention of bowling in England was made, when King Edward III banned it as a distraction to archery practice.

In the 15th–17th centuries, lawn bowling spread from Germany into Austria, Switzerland, and the Low Countries, with playing surfaces made of cinders or baked clay.

In 1455, lawn bowling lanes in London were first roofed-over, turning bowling into an all-weather game.  In Germany, they were called kegelbahns, and were often attached to taverns and guest houses.

In 1463, a public feast was held in Frankfurt, Germany, with a venison dinner followed by lawn bowling.

Modern history

In the 16th to 18th centuries

In 1511, English King Henry VIII was an avid bowler. He banned bowling for the lower classes and imposed a levy for private lanes to limit them to the wealthy.  Another English law, passed in 1541 (repealed in 1845), prohibited workers from bowling, except at Christmas, and only in their master's home and in his presence. In 1530, he acquired Whitehall Palace in central London as his new residence, having it extensively rebuilt complete with outdoor bowling lanes, indoor tennis court, jousting tiltyard, and cockfighting pit.

Protestant Reformation founder Martin Luther set the number of pins (which varied from 3 to 17) at nine. He had a bowling lane built next to his home for his children, sometimes rolling a ball himself.

On 19 July 1588, English Vice-Admiral Sir Francis Drake allegedly was playing bowls at Plymouth Hoe when the arrival of the Spanish Armada was announced, replying "We have time enough to finish the game and beat the Spaniards too."

In 1609, Dutch East India Company explorer Henry Hudson discovered Hudson Bay, bringing Dutch colonization to New Amsterdam (later New York); Hudson's men brought some form of lawn bowling with them.

In 1617, English King James I published Declaration of Sports, banning bowling on Sundays but permitting dancing and archery for those first attending an Anglican service, outraging Puritans; it was reissued in 1633 by his successor Charles I, then ordered publicly burned in 1643 by the Puritan Parliament.

In 1670, Dutchmen liked to bowl at the Old King's Arms Tavern near modern-day 2nd and Broadway in New York City.

In 1733, Bowling Green in New York City was built on the site of a Dutch cattle market and parade ground, becoming the city's oldest public park to survive to modern times.

In the 19th century

A circa 1810 painting of Ipswich, England shows a man bowling with a triangular formation of ten pins, before that variant of the sport is believed to have appeared in the United States. An 1828 auction notice, also in Ipswich, explicitly mentions "ten-pin and skittle grounds".

In 1819, New York writer Washington Irving made the first mention of ninepin bowling in American literature in his story "Rip Van Winkle".

Newspaper articles and advertisements at least as early as 1820 refer to "ten pin alleys", usually in the context of a side attraction to a main business or property as distinguished from dedicated "bowling alley" establishments as presently understood.

By the late 1830s, New York's Knickerbocker Hotel housed a bowling alley with three lanes.

In 1846, the oldest surviving bowling lanes in the United States were built as part of Roseland Cottage, the summer estate of Henry Chandler Bowen (1831–1896) in Woodstock, Connecticut. The lanes, now part of Historic New England's Roseland Cottage House Museum contain Gothic Revival architectural elements in keeping with the style of the entire estate.

In 1848, the Revolutions of 1848 resulted in accelerated German immigration to the U.S., reaching 5 million by 1900, bringing their love of beer and bowling with them; by the late 19th century they made New York City a center of bowling.

In 1848, the Scottish Bowling Association for lawn bowling was founded in Scotland by 200 clubs; it was dissolved then refounded in 1892.

In 1864, Glasgow cotton merchant William Wallace Mitchell (1803–1884) published Manual of Bowls Playing, which became a standard reference for lawn bowling in Scotland.

In 1875, the National Bowling Association (NBA) was founded by 27 local clubs in New York City to standardize rules for ten-pin bowling, setting the ball size and the distance between the foul line and the pins, but failing to agree on other rules; it was superseded in 1895 by the American Bowling Congress.

In 1880, Justin White of Worcester, Massachusetts, invented Candlepin Bowling.

In the 1880s, Brunswick Corporation (founded 1845) of Chicago, Illinois, maker of billiard tables began making bowling balls, pins, and wooden lanes to sell to taverns installing bowling alleys.

The first ABC champion (1906–1921) was Jimmy Smith (1885–1948). In 1927 Mrs. Floretta "Doty" McCutcheon (1888–1967) defeated Smith in an exhibition match, founding a school that taught 500,000 women how to bowl. In 1993 women were allowed to join the ABC. In 2005 the ABC merged with the Women's International Bowling Congress (WIBC) et al. to become the United States Bowling Congress (USBC).

In the early 1890s, Duckpin bowling was invented in Boston, Massachusetts, spreading to Baltimore, Maryland about 1899.

In the 20th century
In 1903, the English Bowling Association was founded by cricketer W. G. Grace. On 1 January 2008, it merged with the English Women's Bowling Association to become Bowls England.

In 1903, D. Peifer of Chicago, Illinois, invented a handicap method for bowling.

In 1905, Rubber Duckpin bowling was invented by Willam Wuerthele of Pittsburgh, Pennsylvania, catching on in Quebec, Canada.

The ABC initially used bowling balls made of Lignum vitae hardwood from the Caribbean, which were eventually supplanted by the "Evertrue" rubber bowling ball, and the Brunswick "Mineralite" rubber ball by 1905. Columbia Industries, founded in 1960, was the first manufacturer to successfully use polyester resin ("plastic") in bowling balls. In 1980, urethane-shell bowling balls were introduced by Ebonite.

Rules for target bowls evolved separately in each of the other countries that adopted the predominantly British game. In 1905, the International Bowling Board was formed; its constitution adopted the laws of the Scottish Bowling Association, with variations allowed at the individual country level.

In September 1907, the Victorian Ladies' Bowling Association was founded in Melbourne, Victoria, Australia, becoming the world's first women's lawn bowling association.

In 1908, the now-oldest surviving bowling alley for the tenpin sport was opened in Milwaukee, Wisconsin, in the basement of the Holler House tavern, containing the oldest sanctioned lanes in the United States.

In 1909, the first ten-pin bowling alley in Europe was installed in Sweden, but the game failed to catch on in the rest of Europe until after World War II.  Meanwhile, ten-pin bowling caught on in Great Britain after hundreds of bowling lanes were installed on U.S. military bases during World War II.

In 1913, the monthly Bowlers Journal was founded in Chicago, Illinois, continuing to publish to the present day.

In late 1916, the Women's International Bowling Congress (originally the Woman's National Bowling Association) was founded in Saint Louis, Missouri, merging with the United States Bowling Congress in 2005.

In 1920–1933 Prohibition in the U.S. caused bowling alleys to disassociate from saloons, turning bowling into a family game and encouraging women bowlers.

On 2 October 1921, the annual Petersen Open Bowling Tournament (a.k.a. The Pete) was first held in Chicago, Illinois, becoming bowling's richest tournament of the day. In 1998, it was taken over by AMF.

In 1926, the International Bowling Association (IBA) was formed by the United States, Sweden, Germany, Netherlands, and Finland, holding four world championships by 1936.

On 21 March 1934, the National Bowling Writers Association was founded in Peoria, Illinois, by four bowling journalists; it changed its name in 1953 to the Bowling Writers Association of America.

In August 1939, the National Negro Bowling Association was founded in Detroit, Michigan, dropping Negro from the title in 1944 and opening membership to all races. It reached 30,000 members in 2007.

In 1942, the Bowling Proprietors Association of America (BPAA) held its first BPAA All-Star tournament.

In 1947, the Australian Women's Bowling Council was founded. It held the first Australian women's national lawn bowling championship in Sydney in 1949, which was won by Mrs. R. Cranley of Queensland.

On 18 April 1948, the Professional Women Bowling Writers (PWBW) was founded in Dallas, Texas, admitting men in 1975.  On 1 January 2007, it merged with the Bowling Writers Association of America.

In 1950, following extensive lobbying by civil rights groups in the wake of the 1947 integration of Major League Baseball, the American Bowling Congress opened its membership to African Americans and other minorities. The WIBC followed suit the following year.

About 1950, the Golden Age of Ten-Pin Bowling began, in which professional bowlers made salaries rivaling those of baseball, football, and hockey players; this ended in the late 1970s.

In 1951, the first ABC Masters tournament was held, becoming one of the four majors by 2000.

In 1952, the Fédération Internationale des Quilleurs (FIQ) was founded in Hamburg, Germany, to coordinate international amateur competition in nine-pin and ten-pin bowling.  In 1954, the first FIQ World Bowling Championships were held in Helsinki, Finland.  In 1979, the International Olympic Committee recognized it as the official world governing body for bowling.  Its name changed to World Bowling in 2014 and International Bowling Federation in 2020.

In 1952, American Machine and Foundry (AMF) of Brooklyn, New York, began marketing automatic Pinsetter machines. This eliminated the need for pinboys and caused bowling to rocket in popularity, making the 1950s the Decade of the Bowler.

In 1954, Steve Nagy (1913–1966) became the first person to bowl a perfect 300 game on TV on NBC-TV's "Championship Bowling".  The PBA later named its sportsmanship award after him.

In 1958, the Professional Bowlers Association (PBA) was founded in Akron, Ohio by 33 prominent bowlers (including Don Carter, Dick Weber, Dick Hoover, Buzz Fazio, Billy Welu, Carmen Salvino and Glenn Allison) after they listened to a presentation by sports agent Eddie Elias. The PBA eventually reached about 4,300 members in 14 countries worldwide.  In 1975, Earl Anthony became the first PBA member with $100,000 yearly earnings, and the first to reach $1,000,000 total earnings in 1982.  In 2000, it was purchased by former executives of Microsoft, who moved the PBA headquarters to Seattle, Washington.

On 28 November 1960, the first PBA Championship in Memphis, Tennessee was won by Don Carter.  It was renamed the PBA World Championship in 2002, and now awarded the Earl Anthony Trophy to the winner.

In 1960, the Professional Women's Bowling Association (PWBA) was founded as the first professional women's bowling association; it went defunct in 2003.

In 1960, the National Bowling League (NBL) was founded to compete with the PBA. It attracted name players such as Billy Welu and Buzz Fazio, but failed to sign top star Don Carter. The league's failure to get a TV contract caused it to fold following its first championship in 1962.

On 26 May 1961 the British Tenpin Bowling Association (BTBA) was formed. Their first General Secretary was Maurice Glazer. 

On 27 January 1962, ABC Television aired its first Saturday afternoon broadcast of a PBA Tour event, the Empire State Open held at Redwood Lanes in Albany, New York, beginning a partnership between ABC and the PBA that lasted through 1997. The Saturday afternoon bowling telecasts garnered very good ratings through the early 1980s, until the cable television-fueled explosion of sports viewing choices caused ratings to decline.

In 1962, the first PBA Tournament of Champions was held; it became an annual event in 1965, and was sponsored by Firestone Tire from 1965 through 1993.

In 1962, the American Wheelchair Bowling Association (AWBA) was founded in Louisville, Kentucky, by Richard F. Carlson.

On 28 June 1963, The first British made tenpin was by H Massil and sons who received the permit no.1 from the British Tenpin Bowling Association (BTBA)

Between 3 and 10 November 1963, the Fifth FIQ World Bowling Championships in Mexico City, Mexico, were attended by 132 men and 45 women (first time) from 19 nations. It featured the debut of Team USA, which won seven of the eight gold medals.

On 25 November 1963, Sports Illustrated published the article "A Guy Named Smith Is Striking It Rich", revealing that PBA stars made more money than other professional sports stars, for "with more than $1 million in prizes to shoot for, the nation's top professional bowlers are rolling in money." This was short-lived, however, for although the number of bowling alleys in the U.S. zoomed from 65,000 in 1957 to 160,000 in 1962, the U.S. bowling industry boom hit a brick wall in 1963. This was compensated, however, by a new boom in Europe and Japan, making 10-pin bowling an international sport.

In 1964, "Mr. Bowling" Don Carter became the first athlete to sign a $1 million endorsement contract: a multi-year deal with Ebonite International.

In 1964, Marion Ladewig, a nine-time winner of the Bowling Writers Association of America's Female Bowler of the Year Award, became the first Superior Performance inductee into the WIBC Hall of Fame.

In 1965, the AMF Bowling World Cup was established by the FIQ.

On 27 January 1967, the Japan Professional Bowling Association (JPBA) was founded in Tokyo, Japan.

In 1971, the BPAA All-Star tournament was renamed the BPAA U.S. Open, and officially became one of the PBA's major tournaments.

In 1978, National Negro Bowling Association pioneer J. Elmer Reed (1903–1983) became the first African-American to be inducted into the ABC Hall of Fame.

On 16 December 1979, Willie Willis won the Brunswick National Resident Pro Tournament in Charlotte, North Carolina, becoming the first African-American bowling champion in the PBA in a non-touring event. In 1980, he became the first African-American in the Firestone Tournament of Champions, placing 13th.

On 27 February 1982, Earl Anthony won the Toledo Trust PBA National Championship, becoming the first bowler to reach $1 million in career earnings.

In 1982, the Young American Bowling Alliance was formed from a merger of the American Junior Bowling Congress, the Youth Bowling Association, and the collegiate divisions of the ABC and WIBC.

In 1982, the 1982 Commonwealth Games in Brisbane, Australia, added women's bowls to the events.

On 1 July 1982, former PBA pro Glenn Allison rolled the first 900 series (three consecutive 300 games in a three-game set) to ever be submitted to the ABC for award consideration. The ABC, however, refused to certify the score, citing non-complying lane conditions.

On 22 November 1986, George Branham III (born 1962) became the first African-American to win a PBA national touring event: the Brunswick Memorial World Open in Chicago, Illinois.

On 18 September 1988, the 1988 Summer Olympics in Seoul, South Korea, featured ten-pin bowling as a demonstration sport.

On 2 August 1991, in Havana, Cuba, tenpin bowling became an international medal-level sport for the first time at the 1991 Pan American Games, and continues to this day.

In the 1992–1993 season, the ABC introduced resin bowling balls, causing perfect 300 scores to increase by 20%.

In 1995, the first Best Bowler ESPY Award was presented.

In 1995, the National Bowling Stadium opened in Reno, Nevada, becoming known as the Taj Mahal of Tenpins.

On 2 February 1997, Jeremy Sonnenfeld (born 1975) bowled the first officially sanctioned 900 series of three straight perfect 300 games at Sun Valley Lanes in Lincoln, Nebraska, becoming known as "Mr. 900".

In 1998, the World Tenpin Masters 10-pin bowling tournament was established.

In 2000, the Weber Cup, named after Dick Weber, was established as 10-pin bowling's equivalent to golf's Ryder Cup, with Team USA playing Team Europe in a three-day match.

In the 21st century

On 31 March 2004, Missy Bellinder (born 1981) (later Parkin) became the first female member of the PBA. The PBA had opened up its membership to women following the 2003 demise of the PWBA. One year later, Liz Johnson became the first woman to make the televised final round of a PBA Tour event.

In 2004, the Brunswick Euro Challenge was founded for amateur and pro 10-pin bowling players from Europe, Asia, and the U.S.

On 24 January 2010, Kelly Kulick (born 1977) became the first woman to win the PBA Tournament of Champions and the first woman to win a PBA national tour event.

In November 2012, after league bowling dropped from 80% to 20% of their business, AMF Bowling Centers of Richmond, Virginia filed for Chapter 11 bankruptcy for the second time (first in 2001), merging in 2013 with upscale New York-based bowling center operator Bowlmor (which did not support league bowling) in an attempt to turn league bowling around, growing from 276 centers in 2013 to 315 in 2015.

In 2013, the PBA League was founded, composed of eight permanent five-person teams, with an annual draft.

In 2015, the Professional Women's Bowling Association (PWBA) was revived after a 12-year hiatus.

Equipment

Ball

	
Bowling balls vary, depending on the type of bowling. The size and spacing of the finger holes on non-customized balls are generally smaller on lighter balls to accommodate smaller hands. Modern resin covers (surfaces) available since the early 1990s enhance a ball's hook (curve) potential, and the shape of the balls' cores (pictured) permit fine-tuning of desired ball paths. In contrast, traditional plastic balls are suitable for straighter shots. Duckpin and candlepin balls fit in the palm of the hand, and have no holes.

Pins

Bowling pins are the target of the bowling ball in pin bowling variations. The size and shape of pins vary but are generally cylindrical and widens where the ball strikes the pin. Ten-pin bowling pins are the largest and heaviest, weighing .

Bowling pins are constructed by gluing blocks of rock maple wood into the approximate shape, and then turning on a lathe. After the lathe shapes the pin, it is coated with a plastic material, painted, and covered with a glossy finish. Because of the scarcity of suitable wood, bowling pins can be made from approved synthetics. Currently there are synthetic pins sanctioned for play in five-pin, duckpin, and candlepin. There is one synthetic ten-pin model approved by the USBC. When hit by the ball, synthetic pins usually sound different from wooden pins.

Shoes

The sole of the non-sliding foot is generally made of rubber for traction, while the sliding foot's sole is made of a smooth material allowing a smooth slide into the release. Bowling shoes can be bought, and may be rented from bowling centers. Wet or dirty soles may not slide properly and could damage the approach surface.

Accessibility
Technological innovation has made bowling accessible to members of the disabled community.
 The IKAN Bowler, a device designed by a quadriplegic engineer named Bill Miller, attaches to a wheelchair and allows the user to control the speed, direction, and timing of the ten-pin bowling ball's release. The name comes from the Greek work , which means "capable" or "enable".
 For bowls the sport has introduced a number of innovations to enable people with a disability to participate at all levels of the sport, from social through to Olympic standards:
 The use of bowling arms and lifters enables bowlers to deliver a bowl minimising the amount of movement required
 Wheelchair and green manufacturers have produced modified wheel tyres and ramps to enable wheelchair athletes to access bowls greens
 Modified conditions of play as outlined in Disability classification in lawn bowls

In popular culture

With notable individuals

U.S. Presidents

 In 1948, two bowling lanes were installed in the ground floor of the West Wing of the U.S. presidential residence, the White House, as a birthday gift for then-President Harry S. Truman. The lanes were moved to the Old Executive Office Building (now the Eisenhower Executive Office Building) in 1955, for the benefit of White House employees; its old location became a mimeograph room, and, much later, the White House Situation Room. On 9 July 2014, the General Services Administration published, then quickly withdrew, a solicitation for bids to replace the Truman bowling lanes, which were deemed "irreparable" for not having had "any professional, industry standard maintenance, modifications, repairs or attention" for fifteen years.
 In 1969, friends of then-President Richard M. Nixon, who was said to be an avid bowler, had a one-lane alley built in an underground space below the building's North Portico. The one-lane bowling alley underwent major renovations in 1994, and again in 2019.

Paintings

 A painting which dates from around 1810, and has been on display at the International Bowling Hall of Fame and Museum in St. Louis, Missouri (before its relocation on 26 January 2010, to the International Bowling Campus in Arlington, Texas), shows British bowlers playing the sport outdoors in the earliest known pictorial depiction of "ten-pin bowling" of any type, with a triangular formation of ten pins, chronologically before it appeared in the United States. A photograph of this painting appeared in the pages of the US-based Bowlers Journal magazine in 1988.
 On 28 January 1950, the painting Bowling Strike by George Hughes (1907–1989) appeared on the cover of the Saturday Evening Post.
 In 1982, American expressionist painter LeRoy Neiman produced a famous painting of PBA star Earl Anthony's million dollar strike.

Informal usage
 Children afraid of thunderstorms are told that thunder is God bowling.

See also

References
Notes

External links

 
 
 "Bowling History", The Historyscoper

 
Throwing sports
Precision sports
Individual sports
Team sports
Ball games
Throwing games
Articles containing video clips
Egyptian inventions